The 2008 Missouri lieutenant gubernatorial election was held on November 4, 2008, to elect the Lieutenant Governor of Missouri. Republican incumbent Peter Kinder won the election narrowly, despite the fact that Democrat Attorney General Jay Nixon won the 2008 Missouri gubernatorial election with over 57% of the vote.

Background 
On January 22, 2008, Governor Blunt unexpectedly announced that he would not seek re-election because he had already "achieved virtually everything I set out to accomplish, and more ... Because I feel we have changed what I wanted to change in the first term, there is not the same sense of mission for a second."

A November 2007 poll conducted by SurveyUSA showed Blunt with a 44% approval rating. His approval among Republicans polled was 68%, but his rating among Democrats was only 23%.

On November 10, 2005, Democrat Jay Nixon filed the necessary paperwork with the Missouri Ethics Commission to launch a 2008 campaign for governor.

The gubernatorial and other statewide office primaries were held August 5, 2008. CQ Politics rated the race as 'Leans Democratic'.

Timeline 
March 25, 2008 - Filing deadline for Democrats, Republicans and Libertarians
August 5, 2008 - Primary (gubernatorial and other statewide office) elections
August 19, 2008 - Filing deadline for other third parties and Independents
November 4, 2008 - General election.

Republican primary

Democratic primary

General election

Polling

Results

See also
 2008 United States gubernatorial elections
 2008 Missouri gubernatorial election

References

External links
Elections from the Missouri Secretary of State 
Missouri Governor candidates at Project Vote Smart
Missouri Governor race from 2008 Race Tracker
Campaign contributions from Follow the Money
Hulshof (R) vs Nixon (D) graph of collected polls from Pollster.com

2008 Missouri elections
Missouri
2008